Hopper is a crater on Mercury.  Its name was adopted by the IAU in 2012, after the American painter Edward Hopper.

Hollows are present within Hopper, which are as bright as the crater Kuiper.

Views

References

Impact craters on Mercury